The Dominion Party was a South African political party establish in late October 1934 by dissatisfied members of the South African Party when that party fused with the National Party to form the United National South African Party, commonly referred to as the "United Party".

Its formation was mainly due to distrust of the motives of Prime Minister J.B.M. Hertzog and the new Afrikaner nationalist faction he brought into the now-united Party. The party was established principally to maintain South Africa's "British connection" (it campaigned to keep the Union Jack and God Save the Queen in 1938 and to enter the Second World War in 1939 on the side of Britain) and particularly the Natal's distinct British culture. The Party won 8 seats in the 1938 general election and lost one in 1943. General Smuts's United Party won 89 seats in 1943, and had had the support of the two Independents, the Labour Party (9 seats) and the Dominion Party (2 seats).

It acquired no seats in 1948 election, and disappeared from national politics. The Dominion Party leader was Colonel C.F. Stallard, who later served as Minister of Mines during the second Ministry of Jan Smuts. The withdrawal of Hertzog and his supporters from the UP government in 1939 can be said to have made the party redundant, explaining its later decline.

References

Defunct political parties in South Africa
Political parties disestablished in 1948